James Ogilvie Fairlie (10 October 1809 – 5 December 1870) was a Scottish amateur golfer and landowner. Fairlie placed eighth in the 1861 Open Championship. He was a mentor to Old Tom Morris who named his son, James Ogilvie Fairlie Morris, after him. Fairlie was a founding member of Prestwick Golf Club in 1851.

Playing on the Old Course at St. Andrews, Fairlie won the Silver Cross Medal in 1849, 1854, and 1860.  He won the Gold Medal (King's Medal) in 1857 and 1862.

Fairlie served as the captain of the Royal and Ancient Golf Club of St. Andrews and was the principal organiser of the first Open Championship held at Prestwick in 1860.  Fairlie was a friend and frequent playing partner of the Earl of Eglinton, Archibald Montgomerie, who donated the "Challenge Belt" that was awarded to the Open Championship winner.

Early life

Fairlie was born in Calcutta, West Bengal, India, on 10 October 1809. He was the son of William Fairlie and Margaret Fairlie (née Ogilvie) of Coodham, Symington, Ayrshire. He took to the links as a youngster and quickly became an accomplished golfer.

His father was a partner in the banking firm of Fairlie, Bonner & Co. which was subsequently renamed Hartwell, Innes, Clerk, Brazier & Co. In William Fairlie's last will and testament dated 9 October 1823, he bequeathed to his son the sum of £19,000 which was his share of the residuary estate, money that would not be his to spend until reaching the age of 25.

In later life, as a result of his great wealth and social status, his name was often printed with the suffix "Esquire". Fairlie enjoyed participating in steeplechase and maintained a stable with several horses. At age 30 he was a participant in the Eglinton Tournament of 1839 which was a re-enactment of a medieval joust and revel held in Scotland between 28 and 30 August. It was funded and organised by Archibald, Earl of Eglinton, and took place at Eglinton Castle in Ayrshire.

He was educated at Charterhouse, Harrow, and St John's College, Cambridge.

Golf career

Open Championship organiser
Fairlie was the principal organiser of the first Open Championship held at Prestwick in 1860. With the untimely death of Allan Robertson, aged 42 in 1859, Prestwick members decided to conduct a challenge the following year that would determine the land's greatest golfer.

In a proposed competition for a "challenge belt", Fairlie sent out a series of invitations to Aberdeen, Blackheath, Bruntsfield, Carnoustie Panmure, Dirleton Castle, Leven, Montrose, Musselburgh, North Berwick, Perth and St Andrews. These clubs were invited to send "their two best professional players", who were to be "known and respectable caddies" to play in a tournament to be held on 17 October 1860.

1861 Open Championship
After first organising the inaugural 1860 Open Championship, Fairlie became an entrant to actually play in the second Open Championship in 1861. The tournament was held at Prestwick Golf Club, Ayrshire, Scotland.

It was the first that allowed amateurs, as well as professionals, to enter. Ten professionals and eight amateurs contested the event, with Tom Morris, Sr. winning the championship by 4 shots from Willie Park, Sr. Fairlie's total was 184, giving him an eighth-place finish in the tournament. He won no prize money due to his amateur status.

Competitions at St. Andrews
Playing on the Old Course at St. Andrews, Fairlie won the Silver Cross Medal in 1849, 1854, and 1860.  He won the Gold Medal (King's Medal) in 1857 and 1862. The two medals have been competed for since 1836 and 1837, respectively.

While at St. Andrews, the illustrator and painter Thomas Hodge produced a pen and monochrome watercolour depicting Fairlie on the links in the 1860s.  The painting sold on 8 July 1999 at a Christie's auction in London, South Kensington, fetching £8,050.

Military service
Fairlie served in the British military, achieving the rank of colonel. He sometimes played golf with his friend and fellow veteran Vice Admiral William H. Heriot-Maitland-Dougall.

Death and legacy
Fairlie died on 5 December 1870 and is buried in the churchyard of Symington Parish Church, Symington, South Ayrshire, Scotland. He is best remembered as the principal organiser of the inaugural 1860 Open Championship.

References

Scottish male golfers
Amateur golfers
Golf administrators
People educated at Charterhouse School
People educated at Harrow School
Alumni of St John's College, Cambridge
People from South Ayrshire
1809 births
1870 deaths
British people in colonial India
Sportspeople from Kolkata